(meaning Woman's Review in English) is a Japanese bi-weekly women's magazine published by Chūōkōron-Shinsha. It was founded under the concept of women's liberation and establishment of selfhood. It was first published in January 1916 (Taishō 5). It is one of the new intellectual feminist magazines in Japan during the 1910s.

Notable works

See also 
 Bluestocking (magazine)
 Fujin Gahō
 Shufu no Tomo
 Shōjo no Tomo
 Shōjo Sekai
 Shōjo Friend

References

1916 establishments in Japan
Biweekly magazines published in Japan
Feminism in Japan
Feminist magazines
Literary magazines published in Japan
Literary translation magazines
Magazines established in 1916
Magazines published in Tokyo
News magazines published in Asia
Women's magazines published in Japan